Tyler Toland (born 8 August 2001) is an Irish professional footballer who plays as a midfielder for Liga F club Levante UD. She previously played for Scottish Women's Premier League (SWPL) clubs Glasgow City and Celtic, English Women's Super League club Manchester City, and Sion Swifts of the Women's Premiership (Northern Ireland). 

Toland made her debut for the Republic of Ireland women's national team in 2017, but has not been selected since November 2019 after falling into dispute with the coach Vera Pauw.

Club career

Early years
Tyler Toland was born on 8 August 2001 and was raised in St Johnston, a village in the Laggan district in the east of County Donegal in Ulster, Ireland. She is the daughter of former Finn Harps player Maurice Toland. She started playing football for Maiden City F.C. while attending Deele College in Raphoe. In 2016, she was voted as Irish under-16 player of the year. She participated in the Galway Cup for Kildrum Tigers in 2017. Despite being the only girl in the tournament, she was on the winning team that defeated Glentoran F.C. in the final. Owing to her home club of Maiden City playing in future tournaments that did not allow for girls to participate, Toland signed to play for Northern Irish club Sion Swifts. In her first season, Toland won the IFA Women's Challenge Cup playing in the final for Sion Swifts against Newry City Ladies at Windsor Park, Belfast.

Manchester City, 2019–2021
On 9 August 2019, Toland signed with English FA WSL team Manchester City. She made four appearances for Man City in the 2019–20 season, before being disrupted by an ankle ligament injury in August 2020. In October 2020 Toland accepted an offer to move on loan to Scottish champions Glasgow City.

Celtic, 2021–2022
Toland signed for Celtic in July 2021, following her release from Manchester City. In the 2021–22 season Celtic won both the Scottish Women's Premier League Cup and Scottish Women's Cup, but Toland was not a regular first team pick and left the club after the expiry of her one-year contract.

Levante, 2022–present
Days after her departure from Celtic, Spanish Primera División club Levante announced the signing of Toland to a two-year contract.

International career

Youth
In 2014, Toland was selected to play for Republic of Ireland Schools. In 2016, she played for the Republic of Ireland U-15s, U-16s and U-17s.

Senior
In 2017, Toland was called up to the Republic of Ireland's senior team for the 2019 FIFA World Cup qualifiers. She made her senior international debut for the Republic of Ireland in September 2017 coming on as a substitute against Northern Ireland at Mourneview Park. In doing so Toland reportedly became the Republic of Ireland's youngest senior player on record, surpassing goalkeeper Emma Byrne. Toland made her first senior start for the Republic of Ireland a month later in October against the Slovakia women's national football team.

Incoming national team coach Vera Pauw selected Toland in her first two squads, for UEFA Women's Euro 2022 qualifiers against Ukraine and Greece. She remained an unused substitute in both matches and was then dropped from the national team squad after falling into dispute with Pauw. The dispute escalated in May 2021 when Pauw publicly accused Toland's father of "harassment and intimidation", which he described as a joke. Pauw insisted that Toland's 18-month exile from the national team could end, but only if she telephoned to apologise for the perceived misconduct, instead of sending text messages: "Maybe a bit of guts would help her".

In September 2021 the dispute remained unresolved, with Pauw stating that Toland's recent lack of first team football at Celtic meant that she would not be considered for the national team in any case.

International goals

Honours 

Sion Swifts

IFA Women's Challenge Cup: 2017

Celtic

SWPL League Cup: 2022
Scottish Women's Cup: 2022

Notes

References 

Living people
2001 births
Republic of Ireland women's international footballers
Republic of Ireland expatriate association footballers
Association footballers from County Donegal
Women's association football midfielders
Republic of Ireland women's association footballers
Manchester City W.F.C. players
Women's Super League players
Sion Swifts Ladies F.C. players
Women's Premiership (Northern Ireland) players
Glasgow City F.C. players
Expatriate women's footballers in Scotland
Celtic F.C. Women players
Scottish Women's Premier League players
Expatriate women's footballers in England
Irish expatriate sportspeople in England
Irish expatriate sportspeople in Scotland
Republic of Ireland women's youth international footballers
Levante UD Femenino players
Primera División (women) players
Irish expatriate sportspeople in Spain
Expatriate women's footballers in Spain